Switzerland women's national bandy team is representing Switzerland in international bandy tournaments. It is controlled by the Federation of Swiss Bandy and made its debut at the 2018 Women's Bandy World Championship.

See also
Bandy
Rink bandy
Women's Bandy World Championship
Great Britain women's national bandy team
Sweden women's national bandy team
Russia women's national bandy team
Finland women's national bandy team
Norway women's national bandy team
United States women's national bandy team
China women's national bandy team
Canada women's national bandy team
Hungary women's national bandy team
Soviet Union women's national bandy team

References

External links 
Team picture in Chengde in 2018
China and Switzerland after their world championship match

National bandy teams
Bandy in Switzerland
Bandy